Le sourire du serpent  is a 2006 French film.

Synopsis 
A cold winter night. A gloomy, dimly-lit street in the outskirts of the city, surrounded by old factories. It is getting late, and Marion, a prostitute who works just outside the city, decides to go back downtown. But she is unable to, the last bus doesn't arrive, its driver has been murdered. She is about to lose patience when Adama, a man in his thirties, reaches the bus stop. Both are trapped in this no man's land. The danger lurking in the dark shatters their nerves. Could Adama, an illegal immigrant, be the killer?

External links 

 

2006 films
French drama films
Guinean drama films
2000s French films